This is a list of medalists in mixed events from the World Orienteering Championships orienteering.

Sprint Relay
The first event was held in 2014.

Medal table
Table updated after the 2022 Championships.

References

External links
 International Orienteering Federation

medalists